Jorge Nisco (born March 6, 1956, in Bernal, Buenos Aires) is an Argentine director and assistant director best known for Killer Women (2005),  Epitafios (2004), and Malparida (2010).

Career 
Jorge Nisco started his career in 1997, when he met actor Adrián Suar, who pitched him an idea for a TV show called "R.R.D.T". The show starred name actors Carlos Calvo, China Zorrilla, José "Pepe" Soriano, Nancy Dupláa and Diego Peretti, and brought Nisco to prominence in the Argentine film industry. That very same year he directed his first and so far only film, Comodines, based on another of Suar's "ideas" as he is thus credited. The movie reunited most of the cast of "R.R.D.T.", with Suar and Calvo in the leads, as well as veteran character actor Alejandro Awada.

In 1999, Nisco directed his first mini-series, El Hombre, which also spun from an original idea by Suar. Adrián Suar would go on to collaborate with his "original ideas" in 10 of the 13 TV series and mini-series Nisco directed from 1999 to 2007, occasionally acting in them as well.

In 2002, Nisco was credited as "second unit director" in the series "Son Amores", which starred friend Adrián Suar. In 2004, Nisco co-directed along Alberto Lecchi Epitafios, a 13-episode mini-series starring Julio Chávez, Paola Krum and Cecilia Roth. It was the first original series produced by HBO and HBO Latin America.

In 2005 Jorge Nisco created his own production of content and formats of fiction, "Quark content" with its partner the script editor and writer Ramiro San Honorio.] Nisco in 2007 working for several local chains Film and Television, Televisa and [Fox Television Studios] to develop formats and scripts. In 2008 filming his second film version of Disney's success Argentina "[High School Musical], the challenge," making its another great box office success of his first film.

External links

References 

1956 births
Living people
Argentine film directors
People from Buenos Aires